TGO may refer to:

 IATA code for Tongliao Airport, China
 ExoMars Trace Gas Orbiter, a Mars orbiter
 Sudest language (ISO-639: tgo)
 Thailand Greenhouse Gas Management Organisation
 The Grand Opening, a Swedish music group
 The Great Outdoors (magazine), formerly known as TGO
 Tyler, the Creator (Tyler Gregory Okonma)